Midtstuen is a station on the Holmenkollen Line (Line 1) on the Oslo Metro, between Skådalen and Besserud. It is the lower end of the popular tobogganing course Korketrekkeren.

History
The station was opened on 31 May 1898 as part of the tramway to Besserud. The original name of the station was Frognerseterveien. On 22 October 1987, a train carrying 12 passengers suffered a catastrophic failure in the braking system further up the line, causing it to roll down and finally tipping over at Midtstuen. One person was killed in the crash and four were seriously injured.

References

Oslo Metro stations in Oslo
Railway stations opened in 1898
1898 establishments in Norway
Holmenkollen